is a train station in San'yō-Onoda, Yamaguchi Prefecture, Japan.

Lines
West Japan Railway Company
Onoda Line

Railway stations in Yamaguchi Prefecture